Simple Modular Architecture Research Tool (SMART) is a biological database that is used in the identification and analysis of protein domains within protein sequences. SMART uses profile-hidden Markov models built from multiple sequence alignments to detect protein domains in protein sequences. The most recent release of SMART contains 1,204 domain models.  Data from SMART was used in creating the Conserved Domain Database collection and is also distributed as part of the InterPro database. The database is hosted by the European Molecular Biology Laboratory in Heidelberg.

References

External links 
 SMART web site

Protein structure
Protein classification
Biological databases